The type 852 tug is the Chinese version of the formerly Soviet Roslavl tug that has been developed for the People's Liberation Army Navy (PLAN). The differences between the Chinese version and the original Soviet version are minor, mainly in the modification of living quarters. For example, space used for milk storage has been converted for vegetable storage, and Russian-style ovens and stoves are replaced with Chinese types. An air conditioning system has been added for operation in warmer climates. These ships still remain active as of the early 2010s, despite their age.
Ships in the type 852 series in PLAN service are labeled with a combination of two Chinese characters followed by a three-digit number. The second Chinese character is Tuo (拖), meaning tug in Chinese, because these ships are tugs. The first Chinese character denotes which fleet the ship is in service with; for example, with East (Dong, 东) for East Sea Fleet, North (Bei, 北) for North Sea Fleet, and South (Nan, 南) for South Sea Fleet. However,
the pennant numbers may have changed due to the change of Chinese naval ships naming convention. Specification:
Length (m): 45.7
Beam (m): 9.5
Draft (m): 4.6
Displacement (t): 670
Speed (kn): 12
Rang (nmi): 6000 @ 11 kn
Crew: 28
Propulsion: two diesel engines @ 1200 hp
Armament: four 14.5 mm machine guns

References

Auxiliary ships of the People's Liberation Army Navy
Tugboats of the People's Liberation Army Navy
Auxiliary tugboat classes